Jarrod Daniel Kenny (born 17 September 1985) is a New Zealand former professional basketball player. He played many seasons in the New Zealand National Basketball League (NZNBL) for the Hawke's Bay Hawks and represented the New Zealand Tall Blacks multiple times. He won two championships in the Australian NBL with the Perth Wildcats in 2016 and 2017.

Early life
Kenny was born in Auckland, New Zealand. He attended Westlake Boys High School.

Professional career

New Zealand NBL
Kenny made his debut in the New Zealand NBL for the Harbour Heat in 2004, playing a handful of games at the end of the season. He played every game and started all but two for the Heat in 2005, subsequently earning the New Zealand NBL Young Player of the Year Award. He played for the Heat until 2008.

Kenny joined the Hawke's Bay Hawks in 2009 and played the next seven seasons with the team.

After a season with the Nelson Giants in 2016, Kenny returned to the Hawks for the 2017 season. On 1 April 2017, he recorded 22 points and 15 assists in the Hawks' 102–91 loss to the Wellington Saints.

Kenny continued on with the Hawks in 2018 and 2019.

In June 2020, Kenny was acquired by the Otago Nuggets for the 2020 season. In his 19th season in the league, he won his first championship and earned co-Defensive Player of the Year honours alongside Izayah Le'afa.

Kenny returned to the Hawks for his final two seasons in 2021 and 2022.

Australian NBL and Germany
After being part of the New Zealand Breakers squad during the 2013–14 NBL season, Kenny had a short stint with Licher BasketBären during the 2014–15 German ProB season.

On 1 September 2015, Kenny signed with the Perth Wildcats for the 2015–16 NBL season. He saw plenty of court time in his rookie season, particularly during the first half of the year with Damian Martin injured. He helped the Wildcats win the NBL championship.

On 11 May 2016, Kenny re-signed with the Wildcats on a three-year deal. He missed time early in the 2016–17 NBL season with a groin strain. Despite his minutes decreasing, Kenny remained a crucial figure for the Wildcats as he helped the team win back-to-back championships.

In January of the 2017–18 season, Kenny began playing in career-best form. His scoring improved by nearly six points per game, while his percentage from beyond the arc spiked by almost 30 per cent. On 22 April 2018, the Wildcats parted ways with Kenny after opting not to take the club option on his contract.

On 26 April 2018, Kenny signed with the Cairns Taipans. He played the next four seasons with the Taipans.

National team career
In July 2009, Kenny was named in his first New Zealand Tall Blacks squad. He made his debut at the 2009 FIBA Oceania Championship.

Kenny's next stints with the Tall Blacks were at the 2011 FIBA Oceania Championship, 2012 FIBA World Olympic Qualifying Tournament, 2013 FIBA Oceania Championship, 2014 FIBA Basketball World Cup, and 2015 FIBA Oceania Championship. He was ruled out of the Tall Blacks' 2016 Olympic campaign due to injury.

Kenny's final stints with the Tall Blacks came at the FIBA Basketball World Cup 2019 Asian Qualifiers and the FIBA Asia Cup 2021 Qualifiers.

Personal life
Kenny is the son of Danny and Liz Kenny. His fiancé, Ailbhe Madden, is Irish.

Kenny graduated from Auckland University of Technology in 2009 with a physiotherapy degree.

In November 2022, Kenny was appointed general manager of the Hawke's Bay Hawks.

References

External links

Perth Wildcats player profile
FIBA.com profile
"Leading from the point" at nbl.com.au
"Tall Blacks guard Jarrod Kenny jumps at chance to play in revamped New Zealand NBL" at stuff.co.nz
"Persistence pays off for Jarrod Kenny as he secures new Cairns deal to go with NBL title" at stuff.co.nz

1985 births
Living people
Basketball players at the 2018 Commonwealth Games
Basketball players from Auckland
Cairns Taipans players
Commonwealth Games bronze medallists for New Zealand
Commonwealth Games medallists in basketball
Harbour Heat players
Hawke's Bay Hawks players
Nelson Giants players
New Zealand expatriate basketball people in Australia
New Zealand expatriate basketball people in Germany
New Zealand men's basketball players
Otago Nuggets players
Perth Wildcats players
Point guards
2014 FIBA Basketball World Cup players
2019 FIBA Basketball World Cup players
Medallists at the 2018 Commonwealth Games